Nagapuram is a village in Medak district of the Indian state of Telangana. It is located in Medak mandal of Medak revenue division.

References

Villages in Medak district